Dave Potter is a California politician, having served at the state, county, and city levels.

Early life and education 
Potter was born in Hingham, Massachusetts to John Lee "Johnny" Potter and Ruth E. (Goedert) Potter.

He attended Allegheny College in Meadville, Pennsylvania. He majored in English Language and Letters.

He moved to the Monterey Peninsula in 1970.

Political career

Mayor of Carmel-by-the-Sea 
On November 8, 2018, Dave Potter was elected mayor of Carmel-by-the-Sea for a 2 year term.  He received nearly 60% of the vote. 

He was reelected on November 3, 2020, again for a 2 year term as mayor, with 73.62% of the vote.

Monterey County Board of Supervisors 
Dave Potter previously served as the 5th District representative and Chairman of the Monterey County Board of Supervisors, board member and Chairman of the Fort Ord Reuse Authority, and board member and Chairman of the Monterey Peninsula Water Management District. In addition, he also represents the Board of Supervisors on the Natividad Medical Center Board of Trustees. Potter previously represented the Central Coast on the California Coastal Commission, and served on the Monterey city council and the Monterey City Planning Commission.  Potter is a registered Democrat.

Dave Potter was first elected to the 5th District seat on the Monterey County Board of Supervisors in 1996. Geographically the largest of the five supervisorial districts in Monterey County, the 5th District covers most of the Monterey Peninsula and coastline of Monterey County, extending southward to the county's border with San Luis Obispo County. The 5th District includes the cities of Carmel-by-the-Sea, Monterey, and Pacific Grove; the unincorporated communities of Carmel Valley, Big Sur, Pebble Beach, San Benancio, Corral de Tierra, and Jamesburg; military installations at the Presidio of Monterey, the Defense Language Institute, and the Naval Postgraduate School; and the Ventana Wilderness area of the Los Padres National Forest.

In addition to representing District 5, Potter is the current Chairman of the Board of Supervisors. He also served as Chairman in 1998, 2002, 2007 and 2012, and served as Vice Chairman in 1997 and 2001. Potter's current committee assignments include the Board’s Legislative Committee, Fort Ord Committee, and Capital Improvements Committee.

Mr. Potter has served on the Board for nearly 4 terms, winning reelection in 2000, 2004, 2008 and 2012. His current term expires in January 2017.

California Coastal Commission
Dave Potter was first appointed to the California Coastal Commission from 1997 to 2009. As a state agency with quasi-judicial regulatory oversight over land use and public access in the California coastal zone, the Commission's mission is to "protect, conserve, restore, and enhance the environment of the California coastline". Appointments to the Commission are split evenly between the Speaker of the Assembly, the Governor, and the Senate Rules Committee. Mr. Potter's seat was one of the four appointees allotted to the Speaker of the Assembly. He was reappointed by the Speaker in 2000 and 2002, and served as Vice Chairman between March 1999 and December 2002.

Potter served on the Commission until 2009 when several environmental groups, led by the Sierra Club, lobbied for his replacement, arguing that Potter's time on the Commission had been "a genuine disaster." In support of their position, the Sierra Club cited Potter's conservation voting score - ranked as the second lowest of all Commissioners and the lowest of any Democrat serving on the Commission at that time. As a result of the Sierra Club's efforts, Potter was replaced on the Coastal Commission by then-Assembly Speaker Karen Bass in August 2009 with current Santa Cruz County Board of Supervisors member Mark Stone.

Fort Ord Reuse Authority
Mr. Potter has served on the Fort Ord Reuse Authority (FORA) Board of Directors since 1993 and currently serves as its Chairman.

As a large, multi-governmental body responsible for the redevelopment of the 28,000 acre former Fort Ord Military Installation, FORA is composed of elected officials at the local, state, and federal levels, as well as representatives from the United States Armed Forces and educational bodies such as California State University, Monterey Bay at the primary, secondary, and university levels. Voting members are made up of representatives from the cities of Carmel-by-the-Sea, Del Rey Oaks, Marina, Sand City, Monterey, Pacific Grove, Salinas, and Seaside as well as 2 representatives from the County of Monterey; of which Potter is one.  Ex officio members are composed of representatives from the Monterey Peninsula College, the Monterey Peninsula Unified School District, California's 17th congressional district, California's 15th State Senate district, California's 27th State Assembly district, the United States Army, the Chancellor of the California State University, the President of the University of California, the Monterey County Water Resources Agency, and the Transportation Agency of Monterey County.

Fair Political Practices Commission investigations
In recent years, Potter has been the subject of three investigations by the California Fair Political Practices Commission (FPPC).  The first investigation, regarding alleged money-laundering, turned up no evidence of wrongdoing, and the plaintiff entered into a confidential settlement with Potter.   In the second investigation, which involved a trip to Ireland, Potter was cleared of wrongdoing.  The third investigation, regarding allegations related to conflict of interest, was closed (without prejudice) in November 2013.

Personal life
Potter is married and lives with his wife, Janine in Carmel-by-the-Sea, California. Potter has three adult children, Myles Benjamin Armstrong, Sarah and Tyler.

References

Living people
County supervisors in California
People from Fort Ord, California
California Democrats
People from Hingham, Massachusetts
People from Carmel-by-the-Sea, California
Year of birth missing (living people)